Baldwin is a borough in Allegheny County, Pennsylvania, United States (not to be confused with adjacent Baldwin Township). Part of the Greater Pittsburgh metropolitan area, the borough's population was 21,510 as of the 2020 census.

Geography
A thin strip of land which is still part of Baldwin stretches north along Becks Run Road, separating St. Clair and Hays, reaching all the way to the Monongahela River. It then forms the south bank of the river almost to the Glenwood Bridge, effectively surrounding Hays on three sides.

Surrounding communities
Baldwin has eleven borders: Five with the Pittsburgh neighborhoods of Arlington and South Side Flats to the north, Hays to the northeast, Carrick to the west, and St. Clair to the north-northwest. The remaining borders are: West Mifflin to the east, Pleasant Hills to the southeast, South Park Township to the south, Bethel Park to the southwest, and Whitehall and Brentwood to the west.

History

The borough was named for Henry Baldwin (1780–1844), a U.S. Congressman from Pennsylvania and Associate Justice of the Supreme Court. Baldwin Borough was incorporated on October 27, 1950, from Baldwin Township.

Demographics

At the 2000 census, there were 19,999 people in 8,193 households, including 5,776 families, in the borough. The population density was 3,465.5 people per square mile (1,338.2/km2). There were 8,883 housing units at an average density of 1,539.3 per square mile (594.4/km2). The racial makeup of the borough was 96.20% White, 2.42% African American, 0.05% Native American, 0.56% Asian, 0.01% Pacific Islander, 0.17% from other races, and 0.61% from two or more races. Hispanic or Latino of any race were 0.65% of the population.

There were 8,193 households, 27.3% had children under the age of 18 living with them, 56.7% were married couples living together, 10.5% had a female householder with no husband present, and 29.5% were non-families. 26.4% of households were made up of individuals, and 13.7% were one person aged 65 or older. The average household size was 2.41 and the average family size was 2.92.

The age distribution was 21.1% under the age of 18, 6.4% from 18 to 24, 26.7% from 25 to 44, 24.9% from 45 to 64, and 21.0% 65 or older. The median age was 43 years. For every 100 females, there were 90.1 males. For every 100 females age 18 and over, there were 86.5 males.

The median household income was $40,752 and the median family income was $48,503. Males had a median income of $39,086 versus $28,458 for females. The per capita income for the borough was $19,918. About 3.9% of families and 5.3% of the population were below the poverty line, including 7.4% of those under age 18 and 3.8% of those age 65 or over.

Public services
Baldwin Borough is served by the Baldwin Borough Library. It has three volunteer fire companies, an Emergency Medical Service, and a Police force of 29 sworn officers.

Government and politics
The Borough of Baldwin is represented by elected officials including a 7-member Borough Council taking the position of Baldwin's Legislative Branch, and a Borough Mayor serving as the borough's Executive Branch. There are nine voting districts in the borough, Baldwin is included in the 14th Congressional District; 45th State Senatorial District with 2 State Legislative Districts (36th and 38th) serving our residents.

The Borough Council is a seven-membered body of lawmakers who abide by and amend the "Borough Code". Members are elected at-large to serve four year terms. Agenda Meetings are held the second Tuesday of each month at 7:30 p.m. at the Municipal Building. Regular Meetings are held the third Tuesday of each month at 7:30 p.m. at the Municipal Building.

The Mayor of Baldwin is David Depretis (D)

References

External links

 Borough of Baldwin (official site)
Historic Pittsburgh Map Collections
1876 - Atlas of the Cities of Pittsburgh, Allegheny and Adjoining Boroughs: Plate 44
1886 - Atlas of the Vicinity of the Cities Pittsburgh and Allegheny Pennsylvania
1906 - Southern Vicinity of Pittsburgh

1950 establishments in Pennsylvania
Boroughs in Allegheny County, Pennsylvania
Pittsburgh metropolitan area
Populated places established in 1950